Ophthalmodynia periodica is also known as "ice-pick headache", is a primary headache disorder, so it is not caused by any other conditions.

Signs and symptoms 
 Stabbing sensations, usually in one area of the head
 Pain may move to different areas of the head
 Pain lasts for a few seconds ("usually 5–30")
 Pain appears out of nowhere
 Pain is completely gone after each occurrence
 Each occurrence happens at varied frequencies

Cause
Ophthalmodynia periodica does not have a confirmed cause, being a primary headache, but can be identified with other primary conditions. "As many as 40% of all individuals with ice pick headaches have also been diagnosed as suffering with some form of migraine headache."

Diagnosis 
The following diagnostic criteria are given for ophthalmodynia periodica:

 Head pain occurring as a single stab or a series of stabs
 Can be felt in the areas surrounding the eyes and temples but is "typically felt on the top, front, or sides of the head"
 Pain lasting only a few seconds with irregular frequency
 No cranial autonomic symptoms
 "Not attributed to another disorder"

Classification
The International Headache Society classifies ophthalmodynia periodica as a primary stabbing headache.

Epidemiology 
Ophthalmodynia periodica was first discovered by a doctor in 1964, where the disorder was first referred to as ophthalmodynia periodica. Since then, the disorder has been referred to as idiopathic stabbing headache.

References

External links 
 WebMd article on Ice Pick Headaches
 Healthline article on Ice Pick Headaches
 Primary Stabbing Headaches

Headaches